Yoyogi National Gymnasium, officially  is an indoor arena located at Yoyogi Park in Shibuya, Tokyo, Japan, which is famous for its suspension roof design.

It was designed by Kenzo Tange and built between 1961 and 1964 to house swimming and diving events in the 1964 Summer Olympics. A separate annex was used for the basketball competition at those same games. It also held handball competitions at the 2020 Summer Olympics. The design inspired Frei Otto's arena designs for the Olympic Stadium in Munich.

The arena holds 13,291 people (9,079 stand seats, 4,124 arena seats and 88 "royal box" seats) and is now primarily used for ice hockey, futsal and basketball.

The NHK World studios are adjacent to the arena along the edge of Yoyogi Park. Therefore, images of the arena are regularly featured at the end of NHK Newsline broadcasts.

Events
 The 1977 World Figure Skating Championships
 The official 1971 Asian Basketball Championship for men
 The official 1982 Asian Basketball Championship for Women
 The 1985 World Figure Skating Championships
 11 May 1985: Queen performed at the venue, which was recorded in We Are the Champions: Final Live in Japan.
 The first regular-season National Hockey League games outside of North America, between the Mighty Ducks of Anaheim and Vancouver Canucks in October 1997. The NHL would return in 1998 and 2000, each time with different teams.
 4 and 5 June 2001: Westlife performed for Where Dreams Come True Tour in support of their Coast to Coast.
 Kishidan held the final stop of their 2004 JAPANOLOMANIA tour at the Gymnasium, with the performance broadcast on NHK and highlights released to DVD in 2008. 
 The official 2006 Women's Volleyball World Championship
 The final stop of the LUV-XURY tour by DJ Ozma in December 2006. 
 Since 2007: Foundation of Japan Cheerleading Association's (FJCA) Cheerleading Asia International Open Championships (CAIOC). 2012 will host the sixth edition from 18 to 20 May, and is sanctioned by the International Federation of Cheerleading (IFC).
 The official 2010 Women's Volleyball World Championship
 10 and 11 July (July 10 show is a night show, July 11 both noon and night shows) "Surprise wa Arimasen" by AKB48. 
 25 and 26 January 2011: SMTown Live '10 World Tour by SM Entertainment.
 17,18, 28, and 29 June 2011: Girls' Generation performed four concerts in the gymnasium for their third stop of The First Japan Arena Tour (Girls' Generation)
 6 October 2013: Nogizaka46 Summer National Tour 2013
 29 May 2014: Luna Sea performed their 25th anniversary concert.
 11 July 2014 - 13 July 2014: Girls' Generation performed a three day concert in the gymnasium for their last stop of the Girls' Generation Japan 3rd Tour 2014
 28 June 2015: Yukari Tamura performed in the first gymnasium as the last destination in her live tour, "LOVE ♡ LIVE 2015 Spring *Sunny side Lily*".
 3 September 2015: UVERworld 15&10 Anniversary Live Sold-out event
 6 September 2015: UVERworld Queen's Party
 JYP NATION 2016 "Mix & Match"
 23 and 24 February 2017: HKT48 Spring Live Tour ~Sashiko du Soleil 2016~
 11 February 2017: YuiKaori performed in the first gymnasium as the last destination for their tour, "Starlight Link".
 12 February 2017: Shouta Aoi performed in the first gymnasium for his live, "WONDER lab. ～prism～".
 21 and 22 February 2017: Haruna Kojima had her graduation concert from AKB48, "Kojimatsuri", in the first gymnasium.
 25 and 26 February 2017: Maaya Uchida performed a two day concert for her 2nd Live, "Smiling Spiral" in the first gymnasium.
 6 April 2017: Keyakizaka46 1st Anniversary Live
 20–22 April 2017: Nogizaka46 Under Live National Tour 2017 ~ Kanto Series ~ Tokyo Performance 
 4 and 5 March 2017: Sphere performed a two-day concert for their tenth anniversary in the first gymnasium.
 3 and 4 June 2017: Britney Spears performed two sold-out concerts at the venue on her Britney: Live in Concert world tour.
 26 and 27 November 2019: Nogizaka46 3rd & 4th Generation Live @ Yoyogi National Gymnasium
 3 December 2019: Stray Kids Japan Showcase 2019 "Hi-Stay"
 12 and 13 October 2020: Keyakizaka46 THE LAST LIVE
 21 and 22 May 2022: Sakurazaka46 Risa Watanabe Graduation Concert
 18 and 19 June, 26 and 27 July 2022: Stray Kids 2nd World Tour "Maniac" in Japan
 31 August, 1, 3 and 4 September 2022: NiziU Live with U 2022 "Light It Up"
 10 and 11 September 2022: Onew Japan 1st Concert Tour ~Life Goes On~
 1 and 2 October 2022: Twice Japan Fan Meeting 2022 "ONCE Day"
 12 and 13 November 2022: Hinatazaka46 4th Tour ~ Happy Smile Tour
 14 and 15 March 2023: Onew 1st Concert "O-New-Note" in Japan
 1 and 2 April 2023: aespa 2023 Live Tour in Japan 'SYNK: Hyper Line'
 12 and 13 April 2023: Sakurazaka46 3rd Concert Tour

See also 
 List of indoor arenas in Japan

References

External links

  
 Sport facilities page on Japan Sport Council official English website
 1964 Summer Olympics official report. Volume 1. Part 1. pp. 121–4.
 Olympic Arena – Great Buildings Online
 

Indoor arenas in Japan
Indoor ice hockey venues in Japan
Sports venues in Tokyo
Music venues in Tokyo
Venues of the 1964 Summer Olympics
Venues of the 2020 Summer Olympics
Olympic basketball venues
Olympic diving venues
Olympic modern pentathlon venues
Modernist architecture in Japan
Tensile membrane structures
Basketball venues in Japan
Volleyball venues in Japan
Buildings and structures in Shibuya
Olympic swimming venues
Olympic handball venues
Boxing venues in Japan
Badminton venues
Badminton in Japan
Judo venues
Sports venues completed in 1964
Tokyo Apache
Handball venues in Japan
Kenzo Tange buildings
1964 establishments in Japan
Suspended structures